Coyote vs. Acme is an upcoming American comedy film directed by Dave Green, from a screenplay written by James Gunn (who also serves as a producer), Jeremy Slater, Jon Silberman, Josh Silberman, and Samy Burch. Combining live-action and animation, the film is based on the character Wile E. Coyote and the ACME Corporation from the Looney Tunes and Merrie Melodies series of cartoons, and the magazine article of the same name originally published in The New Yorker by Ian Frazier. Produced by Warner Animation Group, the film stars John Cena, Will Forte and Lana Condor.

Coyote vs. Acme is scheduled to be released in the United States in 2023, by Warner Bros. Pictures.

Premise
After every ACME Corporation product backfired on Wile E. Coyote, in his pursuit of the Road Runner, he hires an equally-unlucky human attorney to sue the company. When Wile E.'s lawyer finds out that his former law firm's intimidating boss is ACME's CEO, he teams up with Wile E. to win the court case against him.

Cast
 Will Forte as Wile E.'s attorney
 John Cena as the CEO of the Acme Corporation that Wile E. is filing a case against
 Lana Condor

Production

Development
In August 2018, Warner Bros. announced the development of a Wile E. Coyote project, titled Coyote vs. Acme, with The Lego Batman Movie director Chris McKay as producer and Jon and Josh Silberman writing the screenplay. In mid-December 2019, Dave Green signed on to direct the live-action animated hybrid film, while Jon and Josh Silberman were replaced as screenwriters, though they remained as producers. In December 2020, McKay left the project, while Jon and Josh Silberman left their producing roles and returned to screenwriting duties alongside Samy Burch, Jeremy Slater, and James Gunn. Along with the departure of McKay, it was reported that the film would draw inspiration from the fictional New Yorker article of the same name by Ian Frazier.

Casting
In February 2022, John Cena was cast as the film's main antagonist, described as the lawyer in defense of ACME and the former boss to Wile E.'s lawyer; he previously collaborated with Gunn on the DC Extended Universe projects The Suicide Squad (2021) and Peacemaker (2022). The following month, Will Forte and Lana Condor would be added to the cast, with Forte starring as Coyote's lawyer.

In November 2022, Foghorn Leghorn, Granny, Sylvester the Cat and Tweety were confirmed to be in the film. In December 2022, Bugs Bunny, Daffy Duck, Elmer Fudd and Yosemite Sam were also confirmed to be in the film. In January 2023, Porky Pig was confirmed to be in the film. Later that month, Will Forte teased that many Looney Tunes characters besides Wile E. Coyote and Road Runner will appear in the film.

Filming
Principal photography commenced on April 1, 2022, with cinematographer Brandon Trost. Filming took place in Albuquerque, New Mexico, as it is an iconic setting referenced in numerous Looney Tunes cartoons. Filming wrapped on May 28, 2022.

Visual effects and animation
Visual effects and animation services were provided by DNEG.

Release
Coyote vs. Acme was originally scheduled to be theatrically released in the United States on July 21, 2023, by Warner Bros. Pictures. On April 26, 2022, it was taken off the release schedule, with Barbie taking over its original release date. However, the film was quoted to still release on an undisclosed date in 2023.

References

External links
 

Upcoming films
2020s computer-animated films
2020s English-language films
2023 comedy films
2023 films
3D animated films
American 3D films
American adventure comedy films
American children's animated comedy films
American computer-animated films
American fantasy films
Animated films about friendship
Animated films about revenge
Animated films based on American novels
American films with live action and animation
Bugs Bunny films
Daffy Duck films
Elmer Fudd films
Film spin-offs
Films about animation
Films about lawyers
Films directed by Dave Green
Films produced by James Gunn
Films set in deserts
Films shot in New Mexico
Films with screenplays by James Gunn
Films with screenplays by Jeremy Slater
Foghorn Leghorn films
Looney Tunes films
Porky Pig films
Sylvester the Cat films
Tweety films
Upcoming IMAX films
Warner Animation Group films
Warner Bros. animated films
Warner Bros. Animation animated films
Warner Bros. films
Wile E. Coyote and the Road Runner films
Yosemite Sam films